The Darley Hills are a range of high, ice-covered coastal hills overlooking the Ross Ice Shelf, trending north–south for about  between Cape Douglas and Cape Parr. They were named by the Advisory Committee on Antarctic Names for James M. Darley, chief cartographer of the National Geographic Society, 1940–63, under whose direction many important maps of Antarctica were published.

Features
Geographical features include:

 Abercrombie Crests
 Boyer Bluff
 Chamberlin Rampart
 Constellation Dome
 Fisher Point
 Gentile Point
 Grazzini Bay
 Nursery Glacier
 Riddiford Nunatak
 Skinner Saddle

References 

Hills of Antarctica
Mountain ranges of the Ross Dependency
Transantarctic Mountains
Shackleton Coast